Yalcogrin is a bounded rural locality of Gilgandra Shire and a civil parish of Gowen County, New South Wales, Australia.

Yalcogrin is located at 31°37′54″S 148°41′04″ outside of Gilgndra township.

References

Localities in New South Wales
Geography of New South Wales
Central West (New South Wales)